The following is a timeline of the history of the municipality of Breda, Netherlands.

Prior to 20th century

 1252 - Breda granted city status.
 1267 -  founded.
 1321 - Tuesday market begins.
 1330 - Building of the city wall started.
 1350 - Breda Castle built.
 1351 - Polanen Castle besieged.
 1394 - Polanen Castle demolished.
 1410 - Grote Kerk (Breda) begun.
 1534 - Fortification of the city began.
 1536 - "Poor relief" established.
 1547 - Grote Kerk finished.
 1566 - Iconoclasm by Protestants.
 1575 - Spanish-Dutch  held in city.
 1581 - Capture of Breda by Spanish troops.
 1590 - 4 March: Capture of Breda (1590) by Maurice, Prince of Orange  and Dutch-English forces.
 1624 - 28 August: Siege of Breda begins.
 1625 - 5 June: Siege of Breda ends; Spanish in power.
 1637
 21 July: Siege of Breda by Dutch forces begins.
 10 October: Siege of Breda ends; Breda taken by Dutch forces of Frederick Henry, Prince of Orange.
 Grote Kerk (church) becomes Protestant.
 1648 - Breda becomes part of Holland per Treaty of Westphalia.
 1650 - 1 May: English-Scottish treaty signed in Breda.
 1660 - April: Charles II of England proclaims the Declaration of Breda while passing through town.
 1667 - 31 July: Anglo-Dutch treaty signed in Breda.
 1696 - Breda Castle built by William, prince of Orange.
 1746/48 - British-French bilateral negotiations at the Congress of Breda.
 1768 -  remodeled.
 1793 - Siege of Breda; French in power.
 1813 - Siege of Breda; French military ousted.
 1817 -  adopted.
 1828 - Royal Military Academy established.
 1837 - St. Anthony of Padua Cathedral built.
 1845 - Synagogue built on Schoolstraat.
 1853 - Roman Catholic Diocese of Breda established.
 1855 - Breda railway station opens.
 1863 - Breda–Eindhoven railway begins operating.
 1870 - City directory begins publication.
 1883 -  tram begins operating.
 1886 -  and Koepelgevangenis (prison) built.
 1890 -  begins operating.
 1893 -  in operation.
 1894 - Population: 24,397.
 1900 - Population: 26,296.

20th century

 1901 - Tram Breda-Mastbosch begins operating.
 1907 -  becomes mayor.
 1912 - NAC Breda football club founded.
 1919
 Population: 30,044.
  becomes mayor.
 1920 - Gemeentetram Breda (tram) begins operating.
 1921 - NAC Breda wins its first Dutch football championship.
 1940 - German occupation during World War II begins.
 1942 - Ginneken and Princenhage become part of Breda.

 1944
 City liberated by the 1st Polish Armoured Division of General Stanisław Maczek.
 De Stem newspaper begins publication.
 1952 -  design adopted.
 1953 -  built.
 1955 - Mirabelle (Breda restaurant) in business.
 1963 -  established in Princenhage.
 1966 - Breda University of Applied Sciences established
 1975 - Breda railway station rebuilt.
 1981 -  established.
 1990 - Ed Nijpels becomes mayor.
 1991 - Sister city partnership signed between Breda and Wrocław, Poland.
 1995 -  built.
 1996
 Rat Verlegh Stadion opened.
  becomes mayor.
 1998 - BN DeStem newspaper in publication.
 2000 - Population: 160,650.

21st century

 2001
 City joins regional BrabantStad group.
 Moooi in business.
 2004 -  becomes mayor.
 2007 - Redhead Day begins.
 2014 - Population: 179,665.
 2015 -  becomes mayor.

See also
 Breda history
 
 
 
 Timelines of other municipalities in the Netherlands: Amsterdam, Delft, Eindhoven, Groningen, Haarlem, The Hague, 's-Hertogenbosch, Leiden, Maastricht, Nijmegen, Rotterdam, Utrecht

References

This article incorporates information from the Dutch Wikipedia.

Bibliography

in English
 
 
 
 
 
 
 
 
 
 

in Dutch

External links

History of Breda
Breda
Years in the Netherlands